Toropets is a town and the administrative center of Toropetsky District in Tver Oblast, Russia, located where the Toropa River enters Lake Solomennoye. Population:

History

In 1074, when the town was first mentioned in chronicles, Toropets belonged to the Princes of Smolensk. By 1167, it was large enough to have its own princes. The most famous of its rulers was Mstislav the Bold, whose grandson Alexander Nevsky wed Alexandra of Polotsk in Toropets in 1239.

In the mid-14th century the town passed to the Grand Duchy of Lithuania, which had to surrender it to Ivan III following the Battle of Vedrosha in 1503. In the early 17th century, Toropets was ransacked by the Polish army. In the course of the administrative reform carried out in 1708 by Peter the Great, Toropets was included into Ingermanland Governorate (known since 1710 as Saint Petersburg Governorate). In 1727, separate Novgorod Governorate was split off. Toropets was included into Velikiye Luki Province. In 1772, as a result of the First Partition of Poland, Inflanty Voivodeship and eastern Belarus were transferred to Russia. In order to accommodate these areas, Pskov Governorate was created, and Velikiye Luki was transferred to Pskov Governorate. The town of Opochka was made the administrative center of the governorate. Pskov Governorate has proven to be too big to be administered properly, and in 1776, the decree of the empress, Catherine the Great, was issued. It divided the governorate into Pskov and Polotsk Governorates. Pskov was made the administrative center of Pskov Governorate, and Toropets remained in Pskov Governorate. In 1777, Pskov Governorate was transformed into Pskov Viceroyalty, which was administered from Novgorod by Jacob Sievers. In 1796, the viceroyalty was abolished, and on 31 December 1796 the emperor Paul I issued a decree restoring Pskov Governorate. Toropets was the center of Toropetsky Uyezd of Pskov Governorate.

The Soviet authority in Toropets was established on October 30 (November 12), 1917. On August 1, 1927 Pskov Governorate was abolished, and Leningrad Oblast was established. Toropetsky Uyezd was abolished as well, and Toropetsky District, with the administrative center in Toropets, was established. It belonged to Velikiye Luki Okrug of Leningrad Oblast. On June 17, 1929, the district was transferred to Western Oblast. On August 1, 1930 the okrugs were abolished, and the districts were subordinated directly to the oblast. On January 29, 1935 Kalinin Oblast was established, and Toropetsky District was transferred to Kalinin Oblast. The town was occupied by the Wehrmacht during WWII, from August 29, 1941 until January 21, 1942, when it was retaken during the Toropets–Kholm Offensive. On August 22, 1944, the district was transferred to newly established Velikiye Luki Oblast. On October 2, 1957, Velikiye Luki Oblast was abolished, and Toropetssky District was transferred back to Kalinin Oblast. In 1990, Kalinin Oblast was renamed Tver Oblast.

Administrative and municipal status
Within the framework of administrative divisions, Toropets serves as the administrative center of Toropetsky District. As an administrative division, it is incorporated within Toropetsky District as Toropets Urban Settlement. As a municipal division, this administrative unit also has urban settlement status and is a part of Toropetsky Municipal District.

Economy

Industry
There are enterprises of chemical, metallurgical, textile, and food industries in Toropets.

Transportation

The railway connecting Bologoye with Velikiye Luki passes through Toropets. There is infrequent passenger traffic.

The M9 highway connecting Moscow with Riga also crosses the southern part of Toropetsky District. Toropets has access to it via a paved road. The same road continues to the north to Kholm and further to Staraya Russa.

Culture and recreation

Toropets contains 66 cultural heritage monuments of federal significance and additionally 30 objects classified as cultural and historical heritage of local significance. The federal monuments include plenty of buildings in the historical center of Toropets. The oldest brick churches in the town are dedicated to St. Nicholas (1666–1669), to Our Lady of Kazan (1698–1765), and to John the Baptist (1704).

There are a number of museums in Toropets, which include the Toropets District Museum, the Museum of the History of Photography, the house-museum of Patriarch Tikhon (Tikhon, in the future the Patriarch of the Russian Orthodox Church, lived here as a child for ten years).

Notable people
The town is where Patriarch Tikhon of Moscow spent his childhood (between 1869 and 1878) and attended school .

Pyotr Ivanovich Ricord was also born here.

References

Notes

Sources

Further reading
 Toropets. Materials for the history of cities 17th and 18th centuries (1888) ("Торопец. Материалы для истории городов XVII и XVIII столетий") at Runivers.ru in DjVu and PDF formats

External links
Unofficial website of Toropets 

Cities and towns in Tver Oblast
Smolensk Voivodeship
Toropetsky Uyezd